Jane Ngineriwa Kambalame is Malawi's current High Commissioner to Zimbabwe and Botswana. Prior to this appointment she served in the Malawi mission to the United States of America and Ministry of Foreign Affairs in Malawi.

Career
Ms. Kambalame obtained her bachelor's degree in Public Administration from the University of Malawi. She obtained her master's degree in International Policy and Diplomacy from Staffordshire University at Stoke-on-Trent. She then entered the Malawi foreign service as a foreign service officer. In 2004, she served as a diplomat in the United States. In 2013, she replaced Dr. Richard Phoya as High Commissioner to Zimbabwe and Botswana.

Philanthropy
She is a strong supporter of NGOs working with women and children in Malawi. Whilst in the United States, she served as a board member of the Malawi Washington Association.

Human trafficking case

In 2016 Kambalame was found guilty in a default judgment of human trafficking after having brought a housemaid from Malawi, called Fainess Lipenga, confining her for three years in a house basement. Kambalame obliged Lipenga to work from 5am to 11pm for $100–180 per month. Kambalame did not respond or participate in the case.

References

Malawian women diplomats
University of Malawi alumni
Alumni of Staffordshire University
Living people
High Commissioners of Malawi to Zimbabwe
High Commissioners of Malawi to Botswana
Year of birth missing (living people)
Women ambassadors